Donald J. Raleigh is an American scholar specializing in twentieth-century Russian history. He is the Jay Richard Judson Distinguished Professor of History at the University of North Carolina at Chapel Hill. He obtained his BA degree from Knox College in 1971, followed by MA and PhD degrees from Indiana University. He has written extensively on the Russian Revolution, on local history (including two books on the Saratov region), and on Soviet oral history. He edited the scholarly journal Soviet (Russian) Studies in History and the monograph series The New Russian History.

More recently, he has researched the life and times of Soviet leader Leonid Brezhnev. His 2011 book Soviet Baby Boomers: An Oral History of Russia’s Cold War Generation was nominated for the Pushkin House Book Award.

Selected works
 Soviet Baby Boomers: An Oral History of Russia’s Cold War Generation (Oxford University Press, 2011) 
 Russia’s Sputnik Generation: Soviet Baby Boomers Talk about Their Lives (Indiana University Press, 2006)
 Experiencing Russia’s Civil War: Politics, Society, and Revolutionary Culture in Saratov, 1917–1922 (Princeton University Press, 2002)
 Provincial Landscapes: Local Dimensions of Soviet Power (University of Pittsburgh Press, 2001)
 Revolution on the Volga: 1917 in Saratov (Cornell University Press, 1986)

References

American historians
Year of birth missing (living people)
Living people
Place of birth missing (living people)
Indiana University alumni
Knox College (Illinois) alumni